Johnson cabinet, Johnston cabinet or Johnson government may refer to:

Canada 

 Johnston ministry, government of British Columbia in 1991

United Kingdom 
Johnson cabinets, of Boris Johnson as Mayor of London (2008–2016)

United States

Presidencies 
Presidency of Andrew Johnson, 17th president of the United States
Presidency of Lyndon B. Johnson, 36th president of the United States

Governorships 
Governorship of Gary Johnson, 29th governor of New Mexico